An international cricket team raised by Marylebone Cricket Club (MCC) toured India and Ceylon from October 1926 to March 1927 and played several first-class matches against regional and national sides in both countries. Of the many MCC teams to visit Ceylon (now Sri Lanka), this was the first to play first-class matches there. Captained by Arthur Gilligan, the team played 26 first-class matches in India and a further four first-class matches in Ceylon. Team members included Maurice Tate, Maurice Leyland, Andy Sandham, Bob Wyatt, Arthur Dolphin, George Geary, Ewart Astill and George Brown.

Matches in India

Two-Day Match : Parsees and Muslims vs MCC

Two-Day Match :Hindu and The Rest vs MCC

Two-Day Match :Europeans vs MCC

Three-Day Match :All Karachi XI vs MCC

Two-Day Match :Europeans vs MCC

References

External links

1926 in English cricket
1926 in Indian cricket
1927 in English cricket
1927 in Indian cricket
1927 in Ceylon
English cricket tours of India
English cricket tours of Sri Lanka
International cricket competitions from 1918–19 to 1945
Indian cricket seasons from 1918–19 to 1944–45
Sri Lankan cricket seasons from 1880–81 to 1971–72
India 1926–27